The 2004 French motorcycle Grand Prix was the third round of the 2004 MotoGP Championship. It took place on the weekend of 14–16 May 2004 at the Bugatti Circuit located in Le Mans, France.

MotoGP classification

250 cc classification

125cc classification

Championship standings after the race (motoGP)

Below are the standings for the top five riders and constructors after round three has concluded.

Riders' Championship standings

Constructors' Championship standings

 Note: Only the top five positions are included for both sets of standings.

References

French motorcycle Grand Prix
French
Motorcycle Grand Prix
French motorcycle Grand Prix